Fulcrifera horisma is a moth of the family Tortricidae. It is found in Nigeria.

The wingspan is about 10.5 mm. The ground colour of the forewings is brownish, sprinkled with whitish. The strigulation and
suffusions are brown and the markings are brown and rudimentary. The hindwings are brownish, but paler basally.

Etymology
The species name refers to the position of the species at the end of the system of the genus and is derived from Greek horismos (meaning a limit).

References

Grapholitini
Moths described in 2013